The Beast Within is a 1982 American horror film directed by Philippe Mora and starring Ronny Cox, Bibi Besch, Paul Clemens, L. Q. Jones, Don Gordon, R. G. Armstrong, Logan Ramsey, Katherine Moffat, and Meshach Taylor.

The Beast Within is a very loose adaptation of Edward Levy's 1981 novel of the same name, with the plot centering on a couple's son, who begins exhibiting strange behavior after his 17th birthday. Producer Harvey Bernhard had purchased the rights to Levy's then-unfinished novel based on the title alone, but the resulting screenplay bears little resemblance to the novel as it was still incomplete at the time of production. Principal photography officially began on February 8, 1981, in and around Jackson, Mississippi and concluded on April 10, 1981.

It was released theatrically on February 12, 1982; grossing a total of $7.7 million worldwide. The film received mostly negative reviews from critics, who criticized the film's acting and premise while commending its makeup effects.

Plot
While driving through Mississippi, Caroline and Eli MacCleary get stuck on a deserted road. Eli walks to a service station for help. A creature chained in a cellar breaks free and escapes into the forest. It finds the MacClearys' car and rapes Caroline. Eli and the service station attendant find her lying in the forest. As they drive off, two gunshots are heard.

Seventeen years later, their son Michael, conceived as a result of Caroline's rape, has become ill. The family returns to Mississippi looking for information about the man who assaulted Caroline, in case Michael's illness is genetic.

They learn about the unsolved murder of a mortician named Lionel Curwin, seventeen years prior. The townspeople, including Judge Curwin and newspaper editor Edwin Curwin, refuse to tell them anything. Eli and Caroline ask Sheriff Bill Poole about Lionel's death. Poole tells them Lionel's corpse was found partially eaten.

Seemingly possessed, Michael murders and cannibalizes Edwin Curwin. He stumbles to the home of Amanda Platt and collapses. Amanda calls the police, and Michael is taken to the hospital. Doc Schoonmaker tells Michael's parents that he needs rest.

Michael goes to Amanda's house to thank her. They go for a walk in the forest. Amanda tells Michael she is the daughter of Horace Platt, an abusive alcoholic who is Lionel Curwin's cousin. As the teens kiss, Amanda's dog arrives with Edwin's severed arm. They alert the sheriff. Horace arrives and commands Michael to stay away from Amanda.

Caroline and Michael return to the hospital, while Eli, Poole, and Schoonmaker search for clues. They uncover a swamp full of human bones with human tooth marks. Schoonmaker thinks one bone belonged to a patient of his who died years ago. The men go to the mortuary and question Dexter Ward, who was Lionel Curwin's apprentice when the woman died. Ward denies that anyone else was buried in her place. After the men leave, Ward calls the judge and demands money in return for silence. He is soon killed by a possessed Michael.

At the graveyard, the men discover the woman's coffin is filled with rocks. They return to the mortuary to question Ward but find him dead. Michael, still possessed, finds a man named Tom Laws. Laws converses with the spirit possessing Michael, whom he calls Billy Connors. Assuming direct control of Michael, Connors describes using magic to return as a spirit to punish the Curwin family after his death seventeen years earlier.

The next day, the judge tells Poole to investigate the murders. Laws tries to tell Poole that Connors has possessed Michael and is killing people, but Poole dismisses him. Connors kills Laws for talking to Poole. Afraid of his behavior, Michael goes to Amanda and warns her to leave town. While she packs, Connors and Michael struggle to control Michael's body. Michael throws himself from Amanda's window to prevent Connors from killing her. He returns to the hospital and begs to be killed, fearing that Connors will take over and Michael will be unable to stop him. He tells Poole and Eli to go to Lionel Curwin's house and look in the basement. They find a skeleton with a chain wrapped around its leg, which they assume is Connors's remains.

At the hospital, Poole, Eli, Caroline, and Schoonmaker witness Michael metamorphoses into a monster as Connors takes control and kills Horace. Everyone flees to the police station. Judge Curwin confesses that Lionel was responsible for Connors's death. After discovering Connors was having an affair with his wife, Lionel killed her and imprisoned Connors in his cellar. He fed Connors corpses stolen from the mortuary until one night, Connors metamorphosed into a monster, broke free, and killed Lionel. He raped Caroline in the woods before being shot by Lionel's relatives, apparently returning to the cellar to die.

Connors attacks the police station, kills the judge, and is pursued into the forest. He finds Amanda in a broken-down car and rapes her. When Caroline and Eli find him, he attacks Eli, forcing Caroline to shoot him in the head. It is implied that Connors may have impregnated Amanda, continuing the cycle of his resurrection.

Cast

 Paul Clemens as Michael MacCleary
 Ronny Cox as Eli MacCleary
 Bibi Besch as Caroline MacCleary
 Don Gordon as Judge Curwin
 R. G. Armstrong as Doc Schoonmaker
 Katherine Moffat as Amanda Platt
 L. Q. Jones as Sheriff Bill Poole
 Logan Ramsey as Edwin Curwin
 John Dennis Johnston as Horace Platt
 Ron Soble as Tom Laws
 Luke Askew as Dexter Ward
 Meshach Taylor as Deputy Herbert
 Boyce Holleman as Doc Odom

Production

The Beast Within was written by Tom Holland, in his first writing credit for a feature film, and directed by Philippe Mora. The film itself is very loosely based on the 1981 horror novel of the same name written by Edward Levy. Producer Harvey Bernhard had purchased the rights to Levy's then-unfinished novel based on the title alone. However, when pre-production for the film began, Levy had still not completed the novel due to marital difficulties. As a result, the film's writer Holland was forced to write most of the film's screenplay from scratch, with the final product differing significantly from the novel.

Principal photography officially began on February 8, 1981; in and around Jackson, Mississippi. The entire first week of filming was shot at night outdoors. When filming Bibi Besch's rape scene, the actress was required to remain undressed in the cold weather for an extended period of time, and Besch was later rushed to the hospital as a result.
Other scenes were shot in Raymond, with hospital scenes filmed at both Jackson Baptist Hospital and the Mississippi State Hospital for the Insane. Filming later concluded on April 10, 1981. Director Mora has stated that United Artists cut several scenes from the film which clarified some of the story's plot details.

The film's soundtrack was composed by Les Baxter, who considered it to be one of his finest, in his final feature-length score. In an interview with Tom Weaver, Baxter stated that he later received a letter from the film's producer Bernhard, praising his score for the film.

Release
The Beast Within was released theatrically in the United States by United Artists on February 12, 1982.  It grossed $1,250,000 on its opening weekend with an average of $2,545 making it #10 in box office. The film ended up grossing $7,742,572.

Home media
The film was released on DVD in the United States by MGM Home Entertainment as part of their Midnite Movies line in 2001. This version is currently out of print.

It was later released on Blu-ray by Scream Factory on December 17, 2013.

Reception
The Beast Within received mostly negative reviews upon its release, with many criticizing the film's acting, "ridiculous" premise, while commending the film's makeup effects.

Vincent Canby of The New York Times gave the film a negative review calling it "very foolish", also criticizing the film's acting. Dennis Schwartz from Ozus' World Movie Reviews awarded the film a grade C, calling it "a frightfully silly and insignificant horror film, whose only virtue is in the makeup."
TV Guide panned the film, awarding it a score of 1 / 4 and calling the film's premise "outrageous"; however, the reviewer stated that the makeup effects used to transform actor Paul Clemens into a monster were effective and that the film's veteran actors lent credibility to the film's weak premise. Patrick Naugle from DVD Verdict gave the film a mixed review stating, "The Beast Within won't be to every horror buff's taste. If you're looking for just mindless violence and grizzle and gore, this movie is going to feel like it's a big disappointment. I can't give it a really strong recommendation, but I also can't dismiss it outright. It's got moments that shine and moments that drag. Genre fans may get a kick out of it, for no other reason than seeing a man's head expand to the size of a watermelon." Charles Tatum from eFilmCritic.com wrote, "It is always sad to see name actors reduced to taking icky gross horror films just to pay a mortgage. Ronny Cox and L.Q. Jones are very good here, and Meshach Taylor looks the same here as he does now, almost twenty years later...hey, that is the creepiest thing about this film."

Chuck Bowen ofSlant Magazine gave the film 3.5 out of 4 stars, writing, "The Beast Within isn't as bad as its reputation suggests (there's some atmosphere to burn and an impressive gallery of supporting character actors), but it's really only for blossoming cinephiles and horror aficionados looking to finish their essays... Everyone else would be well-advised to mine the sentiment expressed on the film's cover art: Beware." Severed Cinema awarded the film 5/8 stars, stating, "Flawed in places by some bad acting and predictable small-town folks, The Beast Within is a tight show with very good production values, and it seriously needs a big release on a good label and not simply double-billed on an MGM DVD". HorrorNews.net rated the film a score of 3.5 out of 5, commending the film's atmosphere, acting, and makeup effects, while also noting that the plot made little sense. J.C. Macek III of PopMatters gave the film a mixed 5 out of 10 stars, writing "As it stands, The Beast Within is an above-average monster movie with good actors and a sometimes comprehensible plot. All of the answers are there on the screen, even if they are buried. However, horror fan or not, if you’re watching this three or four times to get every snippet of information from the plot, you’ll probably wonder what better uses of your time you might have employed."

Potential remake
On August 7, 2014, it was announced that the film's original writer Tom Holland planned to remake the film, feeling that the original film 'never fully captured what he wrote in the script'. As of 2020, no updates regarding the planned remake have occurred.

References

External links
 
 
 
 

1982 films
1982 horror films
American supernatural horror films
American monster movies
1980s English-language films
American body horror films
1980s monster movies
Films directed by Philippe Mora
Metro-Goldwyn-Mayer films
United Artists films
Films based on American horror novels
Films scored by Les Baxter
Films shot in Mississippi
1980s American films